Košarkaški klub Jolly Jadranska banka Šibenik, commonly referred to as KK Jolly JBŠ, Jolly JBŠ or simply Jolly, was a men's professional basketball club based in Šibenik, Croatia. It was named after two of its major sponsors, local companies Jolly and Jadranska banka.

History
The club was founded in 2009 as a male section of the prominent women's basketball club ŽKK Jolly JBS. Since its foundation, the club has achieved promotion in every season they have competed and in its last seasons (before the dissolve), they have played in the first tier of basketball in Croatia, the A-1 League. For sponsorship reasons club carried the name "KK Jolly Jadranska Banka".  

As famous club KK Šibenka bankrupted, KK Jolly became the most prominent basketball club in the town.

In July 2017, owner and president Josip Stojanović-Jolly reported that the club would not compete in any category of the Croatian basketball in the following season, and was officially dissolved later.

Season by season

Head coaches 
  Nikša Bavčević (2011)
  Hrvoje Vlašić (2011–2013) 
  Ivica Burić (2014)
  Mladen Erjavec (2014)
  Momir Milatović (2014) 
  Anđelko Matov (2014–2015) 
  Ivan Velić (2015)
  Damir Milačić (2015–2016)
  Ivan Velić (2016–2017)

Notable players
 Dino Butorac
 Jozo Brkić 
 Mate Mrva 
 Teo Petani 
 Michaelyn Scott

References

External links
Official website

KK Jolly JBS
Basketball teams in Croatia
Basketball teams established in 2009
2009 establishments in Croatia
2010s disestablishments in Croatia
Sports clubs disestablished in 2017